Emily Wilson (born 1970) is the editor of New Scientist magazine. Appointed in early 2018, she is the first woman to become editor in the publication's 62-year history. Wilson was previously assistant editor of The Guardian newspaper and editor of Guardian Australia.

Education 
Wilson graduated from the University of Bristol in 1991 with a first-class degree in chemistry. Afterwards, she was an English teacher in Malawi for a short time before taking a postgraduate diploma in journalism at the University of Cardiff.

Career 
Emily Wilson worked as a reporter at the Bristol Evening Post, then worked for the Daily Mirror and the Daily Mail. In 1999, Wilson joined The Guardian as a health editor. She became assistant features editor in 2001. Between 2012 and 2014, she was responsible for all the UK digital content and editor of the UK homepage. In 2014, Wilson was appointed editor of Guardian Australia. As assistant editor at The Guardian, Wilson was responsible for the coverage global stories, including science, environment, health and technology.

At the beginning of February 2018, it was announced Wilson had been appointed as the 11th editor of New Scientist magazine and the first woman in this post.

In 2019, Wilson was a judge for the Voyager Media Awards in New Zealand.

References

Living people
20th-century British journalists
20th-century British women writers
20th-century English people
20th-century English women
21st-century British journalists
21st-century British women writers
21st-century English people
21st-century English women
Alumni of Cardiff University
Alumni of the University of Bristol
Daily Mail journalists
Daily Mirror people
English magazine editors
English newspaper editors
English women journalists
The Guardian journalists
New Scientist people
Women magazine editors
Women newspaper editors
1970 births